Javier Álvarez de los Mozos (born 9 February 1976) is a Spanish football manager.

Career
Born in Burgos, Castile and León, de los Mozos started his managerial career at Vadillos CF's youth setup. In 1998, aged only 22, he was appointed manager of Tercera División side Racing Lermeño.

In 2000, de los Mozos moved to hometown club Burgos CF, as Carlos Terrazas' assistant. He remained in the role in the following years, working with Enrique Martín and again with Terrazas before leaving in 2004.

In December 2005, de los Mozos was named CD Móstoles manager, but was sacked the following 27 April. He subsequently had spells at CF Norma San Leonardo and Mérida UD, the latter as Fabri's assistant, before returning to Burgos in July 2008 now as a head coach.

In 2010 de los Mozos resigned, and later rejected offers from CD Aguilar and CD Guijuelo. On 9 February 2012 he returned to coaching with CD Bupolsa, Burgos' reserve team, but stepped down in August.

On 7 March 2013 de los Mozos was appointed at GCE Villaralbo, remaining in charge until the end of the campaign, which ended in relegation. He only returned to action the following 23 January with CD Cristo Atlético, but resigned due to "personal reasons" on 30 March.

On 19 June 2014 de los Mozos was named CD Mirandés assistant manager, joining Terrazas for a third time. On 1 December 2016, after the latter's dismissal, he was named interim manager in Segunda División. Two days later he appeared in his first professional match, a 1–0 home win against Elche CF.

After the appointment of Claudio Barragán de los Mozos returned to his previous duties, but after the latter's dismissal on 18 January 2017, he was again named manager. On 28 March, after only one win in ten matches, he was relieved from his duties. In December, he was appointed manager of Arandina CF in the fourth division, leaving by mutual agreement in July 2019.

On 13 January 2020, de los Mozos was appointed at the helm of CF Villanovense, still in the fourth tier.

Managerial statistics

References

External links

1976 births
Living people
Sportspeople from Burgos
Spanish football managers
Segunda División managers
Segunda División B managers
Tercera División managers
Burgos CF managers
CD Mirandés managers
CF Villanovense managers